Walter Rose (5 November 1912 – 27 December 1989) was a German footballer and manager who played as a defender and made one appearance for the Germany national team.

Career
Rose earned his first and only cap for the Germany national team on 29 August 1937 in a 1938 World Cup qualification match against Estonia. The home match, which took place in Königsberg, finished as a 4–1 win for Germany.

Personal life
Rose died on 27 December 1989 at the age of 77. His grandson, Marco Rose, was also a footballer and later a manager.

Career statistics

International

References

General references

External links
 
 
 
 
 
 

1912 births
1989 deaths
Footballers from Leipzig
German footballers
East German footballers
Germany international footballers
Association football defenders
SpVgg Leipzig players
BSG Chemie Leipzig (1950) players
DDR-Oberliga players
East German football managers
BSG Chemie Leipzig (1950) managers
DDR-Oberliga managers